Cropsey Avenue is a major street in Brooklyn, New York City. It generally runs northwest-southeast, from Poly Place/14th Avenue in Bath Beach to Neptune Avenue/West 17th Street in Coney Island. It forms the northeastern boundary of Dreier-Offerman Park.  

Cropsey Avenue intersects the Belt Parkway at exits 6-N and 6-S.  South of its bridge crossing Coney Island Creek, Cropsey Avenue continues as West 17th Street at Neptune Avenue.  For about half of its length (south of 23rd Avenue), Cropsey Avenue has a central median, making it a divided highway/boulevard. 

The street is named for the Cropsey family, one of the first to settle in New Utrecht.

Public transportation
Cropsey Avenue is served by the following New York City Bus routes:
B6 northbound from 26th Avenue to Bay Parkway
B8 between Veteran Affair's Hospital and 18th Avenue
B82 between Bay Parkway and Mermaid Avenue
X28/38 between 14th Avenue and Canal Avenue (extended to Surf Avenue rush hours)

Additionally, the New York City Subway's BMT West End Line runs parallel to Cropsey Avenue, three blocks northeast on 86th Street, between 18th Avenue and 25th Avenue.

References

Streets in Brooklyn